A biophysical environment is a biotic and abiotic surrounding of an organism or population, and consequently includes the factors that have an influence in their survival, development, and evolution. A biophysical environment can vary in scale from microscopic to global in extent. It can also be subdivided according to its attributes. Examples include the marine environment, the atmospheric environment and the terrestrial environment. The number of biophysical environments is countless, given that each living organism has its own environment.

The term environment can refer to a singular global environment in relation to humanity, or a local biophysical environment, e.g. the UK's Environment Agency.

Life-environment interaction
All life that has survived must have adapted to the conditions of its environment. Temperature, light, humidity, soil nutrients, etc., all influence the species within an environment. However, life in turn modifies, in various forms, its conditions. Some long-term modifications along the history of the planet have been significant, such as the incorporation of oxygen to the atmosphere. This process consisted of the breakdown of carbon dioxide by anaerobic microorganisms that used the carbon in their metabolism and released the oxygen to the atmosphere. This led to the existence of oxygen-based plant and animal life, the great oxygenation event.

Related studies 

Environmental science is the study of the interactions within the biophysical environment. Part of this scientific discipline is the investigation of the effect of human activity on the environment.

Ecology, a sub-discipline of biology and a part of environmental sciences, is often mistaken as a study of human-induced effects on the environment.

Environmental studies is a broader academic discipline that is the systematic study of the interaction of humans with their environment. It is a broad field of study that includes:

 The natural environment
 Built environments
 Social environments

Environmentalism is a broad social and philosophical movement that, in a large part, seeks to minimize and compensate for the negative effect of human activity on the biophysical environment. The issues of concern for environmentalists usually relate to the natural environment with the more important ones being climate change, species extinction, pollution, and old growth forest loss.

One of the studies related includes employing Geographic Information Science to study the biophysical environment.

Biophysics is a multidisciplinary study utilizing systems from physics to study biological phenomena. Its scope ranges from a molecular level up and into populations separated by geographical boundaries.

See also 

List of conservation topics
List of environmental books
List of environmental issues
2020 in the environment and environmental sciences

References

 

Biology terminology
Environmental conservation
Ecosystems
Habitat
 

sv:Miljö (omgivning)